Maheshinder Singh Grewal  is an Indian politician and belongs to Shiromani Akali Dal.

Family and Education
His father's name was Sardar Avtar Singh Grewal.

References

Living people
Indian Sikhs
Punjab, India MLAs 1997–2002
1956 births
Shiromani Akali Dal politicians